Burkina Faso–Canada relations refers to bilateral foreign relations between the two countries, Burkina Faso and Canada. Canada and Burkina Faso established diplomatic relations in 1962. Canada and Burkina Faso share French as a common language and work together on regional and multilateral issues.

History 
In 2019, Al-Qaeda in the Islamic Maghreb targeted a convoy of vehicles working for the Canadian gold mining firm Semafo. While authorities recorded the death toll to be at a minimum of 37, the death toll is likely to be much higher. Survivors have placed casualty estimates in the hundreds. The Canadian embassy to the country described the incident as a "terrorist attack against a convoy of Burkinabe workers of the Canadian mining company Semafo." The massacre also prompted a condemnation from Global Affairs Canada, Canada's foreign ministry. The incident was also denounced by Burkinabé authorities.

Trade 

In 2012 bilateral trade was worth $74.4 million. Canadian exports include machines, electrical equipment, rubber, vehicles, tools, medical equipment and manufactured iron and steel goods. Burkinabe exports include gemstones and oilseeds.

Aid 

In 2010 and 2011 Canada provided $34.85 million of foreign aid to Burkina Faso through the Canadian International Development Agency (CIDA).

Diplomatic representation 

Before 1995, Canada's ambassador to Côte d'Ivoire also represented the country's interests in Burkina Faso. In 1995 Canada established an embassy in Ouagadougou. Burkina Faso maintains an embassy in Ottawa and honorary consuls in Montreal, Toronto, Caraquet and Vancouver.

See also 

List of Canadian ambassadors to Burkina Faso

References 

 
Bilateral relations of Canada
Canada